Thrushes and allies form the family Turdidae. The International Ornithological Committee (IOC) recognizes these 175 species of thrushes. Eighty-eight of them are in genus Turdus and the rest are distributed among 15 other genera. This list includes three extinct species that are marked (X). 

This list is presented according to the IOC taxonomic sequence and can also be sorted alphabetically by common name and binomial.

References

T
Turdidae